Colonial Cousins is the debut studio album of Indian band Colonial Cousins, which is formed by Indian duo composed of singer Hariharan and singer-composer Lesle Lewis. It was released on October 1, 1996, under Magnasound Records.

Reception
The album broke all records including hitting platinum sales in India. The duo also won the MTV Asia Viewer's Choice Award and then later on secured the US Billboard Viewer's Choice Award too. The song "Krishna" won the award for Best Music Video at the 1997 Screen Videocon Awards. The exceptional Indian and Western music fusion generated a new genre of music and won hearts of millions of music lovers worldwide.

Their debut album opened up the doors for Indian sounds to be used in western sounding songs. The style is essentially fusion, with a lot of songs opening with recognizable Hindustani or Carnatic ragas and then segueing into a more pop style. A further cachet to the album is that the musicians who worked on it range from Pandit Vishwa Mohan Bhatt, winner of a Grammy Award for his invention of the 14-stringed guitar, to session musicians who have worked with the likes of Madonna, Boy George, Annie Lennox and other big names in the Western world.

The album had two major hit singles "Krishna" and "Sa Ni Dha Pa" (Never Know the Reason), both of which had their music videos repeatedly played on music channels.

Track listing
The official track listing.

References

External links
 Listen to the album online

1996 debut albums
Colonial Cousins albums
Magnasound Records albums